Peter Ellis is a British Elite and Age Group duathlete from The New Forest, England. Competing at Elite level he is a four time Powerman Duathlon World Series race winner with wins in Gothenburg (Sweden 2015), Michigan (USA 2018 and 2019)  and Hawaii (USA 2019), securing further podium finishes in Putrajaya (Malaysia 2017), Panama City (Panama 2018) and Arizona (USA 2020). He finished the 2016 Powerman Duathlon World Series in 29th, 2017 in 7th, 2018 in 11th and 2019 in 2nd reaching a Powerman Duathlon World ranking of 2nd in June 2019  and World Triathlon long distance Duathlon ranking of 2nd in September 2019. Selected by British Triathlon to compete for the Great Britain Elite team at the ETU European Elite middle-distance duathlon Championships Copenhagen (Denmark 2016), St Wendel (Germany 2017) and Viborg (Denmark 2019), the ASTC Asian Elite middle-distance duathlon Championships Putrajaya (Malaysia 2018, 2019 and 2022), and the ITU World Elite long-distance duathlon championships Powerman Zofingen (Switzerland 2017 and 2019).

Sporting career
Peter Oz Ellis' sporting career started initially as a distance runner, progressing as a club runner with Newquay Road Runners,  Hayle Runners, Abingdon AAC  and Tipton Harriers as well as representing the RAF and UK Armed Forces teams and county representation for Cornwall, Oxfordshire and Shropshire, achieving success in cross country, steeple chase, road running and ultra distance. Notable results include 5th at the UK Inter Counties 10 mile road championships, 7th at the English National 50 km road Championships  and 2nd in the Steeple Chase at the European Allied Air Forces Championships.

In 2012 he changed focus to duathlon and qualified to represent the Great Britain Age Group team for the ETU European  and ITU World Sprint Duathlon Championships with wins at both Althorp duathlon  and Oulton Park  in spring 2013. Competing in duathlons as an age group athlete for Great Britain he won English National, British National,   European and World Championships . He was awarded the RAF sportsman of the year award in 2013 after this breakthrough year.

References

Living people
British male triathletes
English male triathletes
1983 births
Duathletes